The 2009 BET Hip Hop Awards are a recognition ceremony held on October 10, 2009 at the Atlanta Civic Center in Atlanta, Georgia. The  2009 show was hosted by Mike Epps.

Kanye West led the BET Hip-Hop Awards 2009 with nine nominations,  followed by Jay-Z and  Lil Wayne with seven and T.I. with sx nominations.

The rapper and music producer Ice Cube received the I Am Hip-Hop Award, for his role in pioneering the West Coast rap movement in the late 1980s. Jay-Z was the most awarded artist of the ceremony, with four awards, including Hustler of the Year.  Although he was in Arkansas Penitentiary on a federal gun charge, T.I. won three awards, two of which Rihanna's collaboration "Live Your Life". Kanye West was awarded as Producer of the Year.

Performances 
 "Pretty Girls" - Wale feat Gucci Mane
 "I'm Ballin'"/"Gucci Bandanna" - Soulja Boy feat Gucci Mane and Shawty Lo
 "Addicted To Money" / "How Low" - Ludacris feat Lil Scrappy
 "Real as It Gets" - Jay-Z feat Young Jeezy
 "Ice Cream Paint Job (Remix)" - Dorrough Ft. Nipsey Hussle, Jim Jones, Soulja Boy Tell 'Em & Snoop Dogg
 "Throw It in the Bag" / "Throw It In The Bag (Remix)" - Fabolous feat The-Dream
 "Gangsta Luv"/"Gin & Juice" - Snoop Dogg feat The-Dream
 "Break Up"/"Wasted" - Gucci Mane feat Mario & Plies
 "Cell Therapy"/"Get Rich to This" - Goodie Mob

Cyphers 
 Cypher 1 - Nicki Minaj, Buckshot, Crown Royyal, & Joe Budden
 Cypher 2 - Wale, Nipsey Hussle, Gsan, & KRS-One
 Cypher 3 - Mos Def, Black Thought, & Eminem

Winners and nominations

Best Hip Hop Video 
 T.I. featuring Rihanna – "Live Your Life"
 Dorrough – "Ice Cream Paint Job"
 Eminem – "We Made You"
 Jay-Z – "D.O.A. (Death of Auto-Tune)"
 Kid Cudi – "Day 'n' Nite"

Best Hip Hop Collabo 
 T.I. featuring Rihanna – "Live Your Life"
 Jim Jones and Ron Browz featuring Juelz Santana – "Pop Champagne"
 Lil Wayne featuring Bobby Valentino – "Mrs. Officer"
 Rick Ross featuring John Legend – "Magnificent"
 Young Jeezy featuring Kanye West – "Put On"

Best Live Performer 
 Jay-Z
 Busta Rhymes 
 Lil Wayne
 T.I.
 Kanye West

Lyricist of the Year 
 Jay-Z
 Drake
 Eminem
 Lil Wayne
 Kanye West

Video Director of the Year  
 Hype Williams
 Gil Green
 Anthony Mandler
 Mr. Boomtown
 Chris Robinson

Producer of the Year 
 Kanye West
 Ron Browz
 Cool & Dre
 Tha Bizness
 T-Pain

MVP of the Year 
 Jay-Z
 Drake
 Lil Wayne
 T.I.
 Kanye West

Track of the Year 
Only the producer of the track nominated in this category.
 "Every Girl" – Produced by Tha Bizness (Young Money)
 "Day 'n' Nite" – Produced by Dot da Genius and Kid Cudi (Kid Cudi)
 "D.O.A. (Death of Auto-Tune)" – Produced by No I.D. (Jay-Z)
 "Live Your Life" – Produced by Just Blaze (T.I. featuring Rihanna )
 "Turn My Swag On" – Produced by Natural Disaster and Top Cat (Soulja Boy Tell’em)

CD of the Year 
 T.I. – Paper Trail
 Eminem – Relapse
 Q-Tip – The Renaissance
 Kanye West – 808s & Heartbreak
 Young Jeezy – The Recession

DJ of the Year 
 DJ AM
 DJ Drama
 DJ Khaled
 DJ Tony Neal
 DJ Greg Street

Rookie of the Year 
 Drake
 B.o.B
 Dorrough
 Kid Cudi
 Wale

Made-You-Look Award (Best Hip-Hop Style) 
 Kanye West
 Jay-Z
 Kid Cudi
 Lil Wayne
 Soulja Boy Tell’em

Hustler of the Year 
 Jay-Z
 Diddy
 Drake
 Lil Wayne
 Kanye West

Verizon People’s Champ Award 
 Fabolous featuring The-Dream – "Throw It in the Bag"
 Dorrough – "Ice Cream Paint Job"
 Kid Cudi – "Day 'n' Nite" 
 Soulja Boy Tell’em – "Turn My Swag On"
 Kanye West featuring Young Jeezy – "Amazing"

Best Hip Hop Blog Site 
All Hip Hop
Nah Right
SOHH
This Is 50
World Star Hip Hop

I Am Hip Hop 
 Ice Cube

References

BET Hip Hop Awards
2009 music awards